XHEMF-FM is a radio station on 96.3 FM in Monclova, Coahuila. It carries the La Mejor grupera format from MVS Radio.

History
XEQX-AM 970 received its concession on November 11, 1964. Owned then as now by Radiodifusora de Monclova, S.A., XEQX broadcast with 500 watts day and 150 watts night.

In the 1990s, the station took on the XEMF-AM callsign as the station that had it was rechristened XEWGR-AM.

In 2011, XEMF was authorized to move to FM from a facility on Cerro La Gloria in Monclova.

References

Radio stations in Coahuila
Radio stations established in 1964